Gulistan is a very busy street in Dhaka, Bangladesh. It means 'Flower Garden' in Persian, which lead to the speculation that in medieval times there might have been prominent flower gardens. Several important streets are connected to Gulistan which makes it busy and crowded. The street is full of roadside shops. Thousands of people visit this place for their daily needs. The road is always occupied with traffic and passersby. One of the oldest transports of Dhaka City ‘Tom Tom’ can be seen in this street. There is a shrine right at the middle of the road. It is called “Golap Shah’s Shrine”. Thousands of people show their devotion to this shrine everyday and make donations so that their desire can be fulfilled.

There is one major bus stand situated in Gulistan, called the Gulistan (Fulbaria) Bus Station. Most of the buses here are public and the number of buses is very few according to the number of passengers. People often get on top of the bus as there are no longer spaces inside the bus. Some people can be seen hanging at the doorways. Banga (or Bango) Bazar is the prime shopping place here. New and fashionable clothes can be found here with reasonable price. There are hundreds of shops inside the place. The narrow pathways make it hard to roam inside the vicinity. The place is so congested and hot that it is hard to stay long time inside the complex. There used to be a Cinema complex (‘Gulistan Cinema Hall’) here which was one of the oldest architectural monuments. Even though the design was not eye catching and the structure was bizarre, it was one of the modern buildings in Dhaka city.

The 11-km-long Gulistan–Jatrabari Flyover was opened in October 2013 to ease traffic jams and reduce travel time from the usual one hour to just five minutes. Osmani Uddyan park, Dhaka South City Corporation, Dhaka GPO, Bangabandhu National Stadium, Baitul Mukarram and many other important infrastructures are very close to this street.

References

Transport in Dhaka
Squares in Bangladesh